Playground Psychotics is a two-CD live album by Frank Zappa and the Mothers of Invention. It was originally released in 1992 through  his mail order label, Barking Pumpkin, and was re-released in 1995 through Rykodisc. The album features recordings of Zappa and his band, the Mothers of Invention, around the time of the film 200 Motels. The live material on Playground Psychotics is interspersed with excerpts from taped conversations among band members whilst on tour, and the release includes three conceptual sections: A Typical Day on the Road, Part 1, a collage of dialogue which opens the first disc; A Typical Day on the Road, Part 2, which opens the second disc and The True Story of 200 Motels, which appears at the end of disc two. The album also includes a live session with John Lennon and Yoko Ono, an alternate mix of which appears on Lennon's Some Time in New York City (1972).

Track listing
All tracks written, composed and arranged by Frank Zappa, except where noted.

Disc one
An alternate mix of tracks 22 through 26, at times with different titles, appears on the John Lennon and Yoko Ono album Sometime in New York City.

Disc two

References

External links
Release details

Live at the Fillmore East albums
Frank Zappa live albums
1992 live albums
Barking Pumpkin Records albums